Pinki Singh Yadav is an Indian politician and a member of the 18th Legislative Assemby of Uttar Pradesh, India, notably serving three terms since 2012. She represents the Asmoli constituency of Uttar Pradesh and is a member of the Samajwadi Party political  party.

Personal life
Yadav was born in New Delhi to former minister Brajendra Pal Singh. She married Pramod Yadav in May 2010, with whom she has a son.

Political career
Yadav has been an MLA for three consecutive terms, being a member of the 16th, 17th and 18th Legislative Assembly of Uttar Pradesh. She represents the Asmoli constituency and is  a member of the Samajwadi Party political party.

See also
Asmoli
Sixteenth Legislative Assembly of Uttar Pradesh
Uttar Pradesh Legislative Assembly

References 

1981 births
Living people
21st-century Indian women politicians
21st-century Indian politicians
People from Moradabad district
Samajwadi Party politicians
Uttar Pradesh MLAs 2012–2017
Uttar Pradesh MLAs 2017–2022
Uttar Pradesh MLAs 2022–2027
Women in Uttar Pradesh politics